Ḥarsūsī or Ḥersīyet is a Semitic language of Oman, spoken by the Harasis people. It is classified as a moribund language, with an estimated 600-1000 speakers in Jiddat al-Harasis, a stony desert in south-central Oman. It is closely related to Mehri.

General information
Harsusi first came to the attention of outside scholars in 1937, when it was mentioned by Bertram Thomas in his book Four Strange Tongues of South Arabia. While certain scholars have claimed that Harsusi is a dialect of the more widely spoken Mehri language, most maintain that they are mutually intelligible but separate languages. Harsusi, like all  the Modern South Arabian languages, is unwritten, though there have been recent efforts to create a written form using an Arabic-based script.

Because the Harasis people were for centuries the only human inhabitants of Jiddat al-Harasis, the language developed in relative isolation. However, as most Harasis children now attend Arabic-language schools and are literate in Arabic, Harsusi is spoken less in the home, meaning that it is not being passed down to future generations. Though the discovery of oil in the area and the conservation project for the re-introduced oryx herd have provided many job opportunities for Harsusi men, these factors have also caused many Harasis to speak Arabic and Mehri in addition to or in place of Harsusi. These pressures led one researcher to conclude in 1981 that "within a few generations Harsusi will be replaced by Arabic, more specifically by the Omani Arabic standard dialect" though this has not yet materialized.

UNESCO has categorised Harsusi as a language that is "definitely endangered".

Phonology

Consonants 

The pharyngeal consonant // only exists possibly because of the influence of Omani Arabic.

Vowels 

In prominent open syllables or after a guttural (such as //, //, // and //), // is realized as //. After a glottalized or lateral fricative consonant, // is realized as //.

Diphthongs may be realized as ay // and  aw //.

References

Further reading

External links
 Ethnologue
 ELAR archive of Harsusi language documentation materials

Languages of Oman
Endangered Afroasiatic languages
Modern South Arabian languages